Acetone (2-propanone or dimethyl ketone), is an organic compound with the formula . It is the simplest and smallest ketone.  It is a colorless, highly volatile and flammable liquid with a characteristic pungent odor.

Acetone is miscible with water and serves as an important organic solvent in its own right, in industry, home, and laboratory. About 6.7 million tonnes were produced worldwide in 2010, mainly for use as a solvent and production of methyl methacrylate (and from that PMMA) as well as bisphenol A. It is a common building block in organic chemistry. Familiar household uses of acetone are as the active ingredient in nail polish remover and as paint thinner. It has volatile organic compound (VOC) exempt status in the United States.

Acetone is produced and disposed of in the human body through normal metabolic processes. It is normally present in blood and urine. People with diabetic ketoacidosis produce it in larger amounts. Ketogenic diets that increase ketone bodies (acetone, β-hydroxybutyric acid and acetoacetic acid) in the blood are used to counter epileptic attacks in infants and children who suffer from refractory epilepsy.

Name
Before the developments in organic chemistry nomenclature, acetone was given many different names since the 17th century. The names include spirit of Saturn, which was given when it was thought to be a compound of lead, and later pyro-acetic spirit and pyro-acetic ester.

Prior to the "acetone" name given by Antoine Bussy, it was named "mesit" (from the Greek μεσίτης, meaning mediator) by Carl Reichenbach who also claimed that methyl alcohol consisted of mesit and ethyl alcohol. Names derived from mesit include mesitylene and mesityl oxide which were first synthesised from acetone.

Unlike many compounds with the acet- prefix having a 2-carbon chain, acetone has a 3-carbon chain which has caused confusion since there cannot be a ketone with 2 carbons. The prefix refers to acetone's relation to vinegar (acetum in Latin, also the source of the words "acid" and "acetic"), rather than its chemical structure.

History
Acetone was first produced by Andreas Libavius in 1606 by distillation of Lead(II) acetate.

In 1832, French chemist Jean-Baptiste Dumas and German chemist Justus von Liebig determined the empirical formula for acetone.  In 1833, French chemists Antoine Bussy and Michel Chevreul decided to name acetone by adding the suffix -one to the stem of the corresponding acid (viz, acetic acid) just like how a similarly prepared product of what was then confused with the margaric acid was named margarone.  By 1852, English chemist Alexander William Williamson realized that acetone was methyl acetyl; the following year, the French chemist Charles Frédéric Gerhardt concurred.  In 1865, the German chemist August Kekulé published the modern structural formula for acetone. Johann Josef Loschmidt had presented the structure of acetone in 1861, but his privately published booklet received little attention. During World War I, Chaim Weizmann developed the process for industrial production of acetone (Weizmann Process).

Production
In 2010, the worldwide production capacity for acetone was estimated at 6.7 million tonnes per year. With 1.56 million tonnes per year, the United States had the highest production capacity, followed by Taiwan and mainland China. The largest producer of acetone is INEOS Phenol, owning 17% of the world's capacity, with also significant capacity (7–8%) by Mitsui, Sunoco and Shell in 2010. INEOS Phenol also owns the world's largest production site (420,000 tonnes/annum) in Beveren (Belgium). Spot price of acetone in summer 2011 was 1100–1250 USD/tonne in the United States.

Current method
Acetone is produced directly or indirectly from propylene. Approximately 83% of acetone is produced via the cumene process; as a result, acetone production is tied to phenol production. In the cumene process, benzene is alkylated with propylene to produce cumene, which is oxidized by air to produce phenol and acetone:

Other processes involve the direct oxidation of propylene (Wacker-Hoechst process), or the hydration of propylene to give 2-propanol, which is oxidized (dehydrogenated) to acetone.

Older methods
Previously, acetone was produced by the dry distillation of acetates, for example calcium acetate in ketonic decarboxylation.
Ca(CH3COO)2 -> CaO_{(s)}{} + CO2_{(g)}{} + (CH3)2CO v
After that time, during World War I, acetone was produced using acetone-butanol-ethanol fermentation with Clostridium acetobutylicum bacteria, which was developed by Chaim Weizmann (later the first president of Israel) in order to help the British war effort, in the preparation of Cordite. This acetone-butanol-ethanol fermentation was eventually abandoned when newer methods with better yields were found.

Chemical properties

Keto/enol tautomerism
Like most ketones, acetone exhibits the keto–enol tautomerism in which the nominal keto structure  of acetone itself is in equilibrium with the enol isomer  (prop-1-en-2-ol).  In acetone vapor at ambient temperature, only 2.4% of the molecules are in the enol form.

Aldol condensation
In the presence of suitable catalysts, two acetone molecules also combine to form the compound diacetone alcohol , which on dehydration gives mesityl oxide . This product can further combine with another acetone molecule, with loss of another molecule of water, yielding phorone and other compounds.

Polymerisation
One might expect acetone to also form polymers and (possibly cyclic) oligomers of two types. In one type, units could be acetone molecules linked by ether bridges  derived by from the opening of the double bond, to give a polyketal-like (PKA) chain . The other type could be obtained through repeated aldol condensation, with one molecule of water removed at each step, yielding a poly(methylacetylene) (PMA) chain .

PKA type
The conversion of acetone to a polyketal (PKA)  would be analogous to the formation of paraformaldehyde from formol, and of trithioacetone from thioacetone.  In 1960, Soviet chemists observed that the thermodynamics of this process is unfavourable for liquid acetone, so that it (unlike thioacetone and formol) is not expected to polymerise spontaneously, even with catalysts. However, they observed that the thermodynamics became favourable for crystalline solid acetone at the melting point (−96 °C). They claimed to have obtained such a polymer (a white elastic solid, soluble in acetone, stable for several hours at room temperature) by depositing vapor of acetone, with some magnesium as a catalyst, onto a very cold surface.

In 1962, Wasaburo Kawai reported the synthesis of a similar product, from liquid acetone cooled to −70 to −78 °C, using n-butyl lithium or triethylaluminium as catalysts.  He claimed that the infrared absorption spectrum showed the presence of  linkages but no  groups.  However, conflicting results were obtained later by other investigators.

PMA type
The PMA type polymers of acetone would be equivalent to the product of polymerisation of propyne, except for a keto end group.

Biochemistry

Biosynthesis
Small amounts of acetone are produced in the body by the decarboxylation of ketone bodies. Certain dietary patterns, including prolonged fasting and high-fat low-carbohydrate dieting, can produce ketosis, in which acetone is formed in body tissue. Certain health conditions, such as alcoholism and diabetes, can produce ketoacidosis, uncontrollable ketosis that leads to a sharp, and potentially fatal, increase in the acidity of the blood.  Since it is a byproduct of fermentation, acetone is a byproduct of the distillery industry.

Acetone can be produced from the oxidation of ingested isopropanol, or from the spontaneous/enzymatic breakdown of acetoacetate (a ketone body) in ketotic individuals.

Metabolism
Although some biochemistry textbooks and current research publications indicate that acetone cannot be metabolized, there is evidence to the contrary. It can then be metabolized either by CYP2E1 via methylglyoxal to D-lactate and pyruvate, and ultimately glucose/energy, or by a different pathway via propylene glycol to pyruvate, lactate, acetate (usable for energy) and propionaldehyde.

Uses

Industrial
About a third of the world's acetone is used as a solvent, and a quarter is consumed as acetone cyanohydrin, a precursor to methyl methacrylate.

Solvent
Acetone is a good solvent for many plastics and some synthetic fibers. It is used for thinning polyester resin, cleaning tools used with it, and dissolving two-part epoxies and superglue before they harden. It is used as one of the volatile components of some paints and varnishes. As a heavy-duty degreaser, it is useful in the preparation of metal prior to painting or soldering, and to remove rosin flux after soldering (to prevent adhesion of dirt and electrical leakage and perhaps corrosion or for cosmetic reasons), although it may attack some electronic components, such as polystyrene capacitors.

Acetylene carrier
Although itself flammable, acetone is used extensively as a solvent for the safe transportation and storage of acetylene, which cannot be safely pressurized as a pure compound. Vessels containing a porous material are first filled with acetone followed by acetylene, which dissolves into the acetone.

Chemical intermediate
Acetone is used to synthesize methyl methacrylate. It begins with the initial conversion of acetone to acetone cyanohydrin via reaction with hydrogen cyanide (HCN):
(CH3)2CO + HCN -> (CH3)2C(OH)CN
In a subsequent step, the nitrile is hydrolyzed to the unsaturated amide, which is esterified:
(CH3)2C(OH)CN + CH3OH -> CH2=C(CH3)CO2CH3 + NH3
The third major use of acetone (about 20%) is synthesizing bisphenol A. Bisphenol A is a component of many polymers such as polycarbonates, polyurethanes, and epoxy resins. The synthesis involves the condensation of acetone with phenol:
(CH3)2CO + 2 C6H5OH -> (CH3)2C(C6H4OH)2 + H2O
Many millions of kilograms of acetone are consumed in the production of the solvents methyl isobutyl alcohol and methyl isobutyl ketone. These products arise via an initial aldol condensation to give diacetone alcohol.
2 (CH3)2CO -> (CH3)2C(OH)CH2C(O)CH3
Condensation with acetylene gives 2-methylbut-3-yn-2-ol, precursor to synthetic terpenes and terpenoids.

Laboratory

Chromatography

Spectroscopy techniques are useful when the sample being tested is pure, or a very common mixture.  When an unknown mixture is being analyzed it must be broken down into its individual parts. Chromatography techniques can be used to break apart mixtures into their components allowing for each part to be analyzed separately.

Thin layer chromatography (TLC) is a quick alternative to more complex chromatography methods. TLC can be used to analyze inks and dyes by extracting the individual components. This can be used to investigate notes or fibers left at the scene since each company's product is slightly different and those differences can be seen with TLC.  The only limiting factor with TLC analysis is the necessity for the components to be soluble in whatever solution is used to carry the components up the analysis plate.  This solution is called the mobile phase. The forensic chemist can compare unknowns with known standards  by looking at the distance each component travelled.  This distance, when compared to the starting point, is known as the retention factor (Rf) for each extracted component. If each Rf value matches a known sample, that is an indication of the unknown's identity.

High-performance liquid chromatography can be used to extract individual components from a mixture dissolved in a solution.  HPLC is used for nonvolatile mixtures that would not be suitable for gas chromatography.  This is useful in drug analysis where the pharmaceutical is a combination drug since the components would separate, or elute, at different times allowing for the verification of each component. The eluates from the HPLC column are then fed into various detectors that produce a peak on a graph relative to its concentration as it elutes off the column.  The most common type of detector is an ultraviolet-visible spectrometer as the most common item of interest tested with HPLC, pharmaceuticals, have UV absorbance.

Gas chromatography (GC) performs the same function as liquid chromatography, but it is used for volatile mixtures.  In forensic chemistry, the most common GC instruments use mass spectrometry as their detector. GC-MS can be used in investigations of arson, poisoning, and explosions to determine exactly what was used. In theory, GC-MS instruments can detect substances whose concentrations are in the femtogram range.  However, the practical detection limit for GC-MS is in the picogram range.  GC-MS is also capable of quantifying the substances it detects; chemists can use this information to determine the effect the substance would have on an individual.  GC-MS instruments need around 1,000 times more of the substance to quantify the amount than they need simply to detect it; the limit of quantification is typically in the nanogram range.

Chemical research
In the laboratory, acetone is used as a polar, aprotic solvent in a variety of organic reactions, such as SN2 reactions. The use of acetone solvent is critical for the Jones oxidation. It does not form an azeotrope with water (see azeotrope tables). It is a common solvent for rinsing laboratory glassware because of its low cost and volatility. Despite its common use as a supposed drying agent, it is not effective except by bulk displacement and dilution. Acetone can be cooled with dry ice to −78 °C without freezing; acetone/dry ice baths are commonly used to conduct reactions at low temperatures. Acetone is fluorescent under ultraviolet light, and its vapor can be used as a fluorescent tracer in fluid flow experiments.

Acetone is used to precipitate proteins.

Cleaning
Low-grade acetone is commonly used in academic laboratory settings as a glassware rinsing agent for removing residue and solids before a final wash.

Low-temperature bath
A mixture of acetone and dry ice is a popular cooling bath that maintains a temperature of −78 °C as long as there is some dry ice left.

Histology
Acetone is used in the field of pathology to find lymph nodes in fatty tissues for tumor staging (such as looking for lymph nodes in the fat surrounding the intestines). This helps dissolve the fat, and hardens the nodes, making finding them easier.

Acetone also used for destaining microscope slides of certain stains.

Lewis base properties
Acetone is a weak Lewis base that forms adducts with soft acids like I2 and hard acids like phenol. Acetone also  forms complexes with divalent metals.

Medical

Drug solvent and excipient
Acetone is used as a solvent by the pharmaceutical industry and as a denaturant in denatured alcohol.
Acetone is also present as an excipient in some pharmaceutical drugs.

Skin defatting
Dermatologists use acetone with alcohol for acne treatments to chemically peel dry skin.  Common agents used today for chemical peeling are salicylic acid, glycolic acid, azelaic acid, 30% salicylic acid in ethanol, and trichloroacetic acid (TCA). Prior to chemexfoliation, the skin is cleaned and excess fat removed in a process called defatting. Acetone, Septisol, or a combination of these agents is commonly used in this process.

Anticonvulsant
Acetone has been shown to have anticonvulsant effects in animal models of epilepsy, in the absence of toxicity, when administered in millimolar concentrations. It has been hypothesized that the high-fat low-carbohydrate ketogenic diet used clinically to control drug-resistant epilepsy in children works by elevating acetone in the brain. Because of their higher energy requirements, children have higher acetone production than most adults – and the younger the child, the higher the expected production. This indicates that children are not uniquely susceptible to acetone exposure. External exposures are small compared to the exposures associated with the ketogenic diet.

Domestic and other niche uses
Acetone is often the primary component in cleaning agents such as nail polish and superglue removers. It may attack some plastics, however.

Make-up artists use acetone to remove skin adhesive from the netting of wigs and mustaches by immersing the item in an acetone bath, then removing the softened glue residue with a stiff brush.

Acetone is often used for vapor polishing of printing artifacts on 3D-printed models printed with ABS plastic. The technique, called acetone vapor bath smoothing, involves placing the printed part in a sealed chamber containing a small amount of acetone, and heating to around 80 degrees Celsius for 10 minutes. This creates a vapor of acetone in the container. The acetone condenses evenly all over the part, causing the surface to soften and liquefy. Surface tension then smooths the semi-liquid plastic. When the part is removed from the chamber, the acetone component evaporates leaving a glassy-smooth part free of striation, patterning, and visible layer edges, common features in untreated 3D printed parts.

Acetone efficiently removes felt-tipped pen marks from glass and metals.

Safety

Chemical
Acetone is incompatible with concentrated nitric and sulfuric acid mixtures. It may also explode when mixed with chloroform in the presence of a base. When oxidized, for example by reacting with hydrogen peroxide, it forms acetone peroxide, which is a highly unstable, primary explosive compound. It may be formed accidentally, e.g. when waste hydrogen peroxide is poured into waste solvent containing acetone. Due to its instability, acetone peroxide's industrial use is forbidden in Europe; in the United States it is limited to minor applications, such as bleaching of flour.

Flammability
The most hazardous property of acetone is its extreme flammability. In small amounts acetone burns with a dull blue flame, in larger amounts the evaporation of fuel causes incomplete combustion and a bright yellow flame. Vapors can flow along surfaces to distant ignition sources and flash back. Static discharge may also ignite acetone vapors, though acetone has a very high ignition initiation energy point and therefore accidental ignition is rare. Even pouring or spraying acetone over red-glowing coal will not ignite it, due to the high concentration of vapour and the cooling effect of evaporation of the liquid. Auto-ignition temperature is depends upon experimental conditions, such as exposure time, and thus can be quoted as high as 535 °C. The flame temperature of pure acetone is 1980 °C.

Toxicity
Acetone has been studied extensively and is believed to exhibit only slight toxicity in normal use.  There is no strong evidence of chronic health effects if basic precautions are followed. It is generally recognized to have low acute and chronic toxicity if ingested and/or inhaled.  Acetone is not currently regarded as a carcinogen, a mutagenic chemical nor a concern for chronic neurotoxicity effects.

Acetone can be found as an ingredient in a variety of consumer products ranging from cosmetics to processed and unprocessed foods. Acetone has been rated as a generally recognized as safe (GRAS) substance when present in beverages, baked foods, desserts, and preserves at concentrations ranging from 5 to 8 mg/L.

Acetone is however an irritant, causing mild skin irritation and moderate to severe eye irritation. At high vapor concentrations, it may depress the central nervous system like many other solvents.  Acute toxicity for mice by ingestion (LD50) is 3 g/kg, and by inhalation (LC50) is 44 g/m3 over 4 hours.

EPA classification
In 1995, the United States Environmental Protection Agency (EPA) removed acetone from the list of volatile organic compounds. The companies requesting the removal argued that it would "contribute to the achievement of several important environmental goals and would support EPA's pollution prevention efforts", and that acetone could be used as a substitute for several compounds that are listed as hazardous air pollutants (HAP) under section 112 of the Clean Air Act. In making its decision EPA conducted an extensive review of the available toxicity data on acetone, which was continued through the 2000s. It found that the evaluable "data are inadequate for an assessment of the human carcinogenic potential of acetone."

Environmental effects
Although acetone occurs naturally in the environment in plants, trees, volcanic gases, forest fires, and as a product of the breakdown of body fat, the majority of the acetone released into the environment is of industrial origin. Acetone evaporates rapidly, even from water and soil. Once in the atmosphere, it has a 22-day half-life and is degraded by UV light via photolysis (primarily into methane and ethane.) Consumption by microorganisms contributes to the dissipation of acetone in soil, animals, or waterways.

The LD50 of acetone for mammals, such as rats, rabbits and sheep, varies from tens to hundreds of mg per kg of body weight, depending on the administration route (oral or intravenous) and other experimental conditions. Its half-life in water is 2 to 20 days, and in human blood is 18 hours. Acetone may pose a significant risk of oxygen depletion in aquatic systems due to microbial consumption.

Extraterrestrial occurrence
On 30 July 2015, scientists reported that upon the first touchdown of the Philae lander on comet 67P surface, measurements by the COSAC and Ptolemy instruments revealed sixteen organic compounds, four of which were seen for the first time on a comet, including acetamide, acetone, methyl isocyanate, and propionaldehyde.

References

Cited sources

External links

 
 NIOSH Pocket Guide to Chemical Hazards
 Acetone Safety Data Sheet (SDS)
 Hazardous substances databank entry at the national library of medicine 
 
 Calculation of vapor pressure, liquid density, dynamic liquid viscosity, surface tension of acetone

Household chemicals
Cosmetics chemicals
Biotechnology products
Alkanones
Ketone solvents
Fuel additives
Excipients
Commodity chemicals
GABAA receptor positive allosteric modulators
Anticonvulsants